Need's Camp is a settlement in Buffalo City in the Eastern Cape province of South Africa.

References

Populated places in Buffalo City Metropolitan Municipality